Frederick August Charles, Prince of Hohenlohe-Öhringen  (27 November 1784 – 15 February 1853) was a German general of the Napoleonic Wars and nobleman of the house of Hohenlohe.

Early life
August was born on 27 November 1784 in Breslau. His parents were Frederick Louis, Prince of Hohenlohe-Ingelfingen (1748–1818) and Countess Maria Amalie von Hoym and his younger brother was Prince Adolf zu Hohenlohe-Ingelfingen who briefly served as Minister-President of Prussia in 1862 and was succeeded by Otto von Bismarck.

His father was the eldest son of Heinrich August, 1st Prince of Hohenlohe-Ingelfingen and Wilhelmine Eleonora von Hohenlohe-Öhringen. His nephew was Prince Kraft zu Hohenlohe-Ingelfingen. His maternal grandparents were Count Julius Gebhard von Hoym and Christiane Charlotte Sophie von Dieskau.

Career
He was a German general during the Napoleonic Wars.

Upon his parents' marriage in 1782, his father acquired the estates of Slawentzitz, Ujest and Bitschin in Silesia, an area of 108 square miles. In August 1806 his family's lands were assigned by the German Mediatisation process to the new Kingdom of Württemberg. In 1820–35 he was elected chairman of the "Kammer der Standesherren" (Upper House) of the Estates of Württemberg.

Personal life

In 1811, he married Louise of Württemberg, a member of the Württemberg royal family. Luise was a daughter of Princess Louise of Stolberg-Gedern and Duke Eugen of Württemberg (the brother of Empress Maria Feodorovna, consort of Paul I of Russia) and a sister of Duke Eugen of Württemberg. They were the parents of:

 Friedrich Ludwig Eugen Carl Adalbert Emil August zu Hohenlohe-Öhringen (1812–1892), who renounced his rights as firstborn son in 1842; he married Mathilde, Baroness von Brauneck (1821–1896) in 1844.
 Friederike Mathilde zu Hohenlohe-Öhringen (1814–1888), who married Günther Friedrich Karl II, Prince of Schwarzburg-Sondershausen in 1835.
 Friedrich Wilhelm Eugen Karl Hugo, Prince of Hohenlohe-Öhringen, Duke of Ujest (1816–1897), who married Princess Pauline von Fürstenberg (1829–1900), youngest child of Amalie of Baden and Charles Egon II, Prince of Fürstenberg, in 1847.
 Felix Eugen Wilhelm Ludwig Albrecht Karl zu Hohenlohe-Öhringen (1818–1900), who married Princess Alexandrine von Hanau, Countess of Schaumburg (1830–1871), a daughter of Gertrude von Hanau and Frederick William, Elector of Hesse, in 1851.

Prince August died on 15 February 1853 at Slawentzitz Castle.

Descendants
Through his son Hugo, he was the grandfather of Princess Margarethe of Hohenlohe-Öhringen (1865–1940), who was the second wife of Wilhelm of Hohenzollern, Count of Hohenau (himself a morganatic son of Prince Albert of Prussia).

Gallery

References
Notes

Sources

1784 births
1853 deaths
German commanders of the Napoleonic Wars
House of Hohenlohe
Lieutenant generals of Württemberg